Indianerna (the Indians) are a Swedish motorcycle speedway team based in Kumla, Sweden. The club's official name is Kumla MSK and it was founded in 1936 which makes the club one of the oldest motorsport clubs in Sweden. They are two times champions of Sweden. and compete in the Elitserien Their home stadium is the Glottra Skog Arena (Sannaheds Motorstadion) south of Kumla.

History
Indianerna was one of the seven teams that competed in Sweden's first speedway league in 1948. From 1952 to 1954 they managed to finish in the top three teams but then had a lean spell until 1976 when they finished second. The golden period for the club started in 1986 with two third place finishes in 1986 and 1987, this was followed by a second place the following year and another third place in 1989. They finally won the Elitserien in 1990 and retained their title the following year.

In 2020, after a 6th place finish in the league they reached the play off final where they lost to Masarna.

Season summary

Teams

2023 team

Previous teams

2015 Team

 
 
 
 
 
 
 
 
Guest Riders
 
 
 

2022 teams

First team

 
 
 
 
 
 
 
 
 

2nd & 3rd teams

References

Swedish speedway teams
Sport in Örebro County